Thesium is a genus of flowering plants in the family Santalaceae. It is particularly well represented in South Africa.

The following species are recognised by The Plant List:

Thesium acuminatum A.W. Hill
Thesium acutissimum A. DC.
Thesium aellenianum Lawalrée
Thesium affine Schltr.
Thesium aggregatum A.W. Hill
Thesium alatum Hilliard & B.L. Burtt
Thesium albomontanum Compton
Thesium alpinum L.
Thesium amicorum Lawalrée
Thesium andongense Hiern
Thesium angolense Pilg.
Thesium angulosum DC.
Thesium annulatum A.W. Hill
Thesium annuum Lawalrée
Thesium aphyllum Mart. ex A. DC.
Thesium archeri Compton
Thesium arvense Horv.
Thesium asperifolium A.W. Hill
Thesium asterias A.W. Hill
Thesium atrum A.W.Hill
Thesium auriculatum Vandas
Thesium australe R. Br.
Thesium bangweolense R.E. Fr.
Thesium bathyschistum Schltr.
Thesium bavarum Schrank
Thesium bequaertii Robyns & Lawalrée
Thesium bergeri Zucc.
Thesium boissierianum A. DC.
Thesium bomiense C.Y. Wu ex D.D. Tao
Thesium brachyanthum Baker
Thesium brachygyne Schltr.
Thesium brachyphyllum Boiss.
Thesium brasiliense A. DC.
Thesium brevibarbatum Pilg.
Thesium brevibracteatum P.C. Tam
Thesium breyeri N.E. Br.
Thesium bundiense Hilliard
Thesium burchellii A.W. Hill
Thesium burkei A.W. Hill
Thesium caespitosum Robyns & Lawalrée
Thesium capitatum L.
Thesium capitellatum A. DC.
Thesium capituliflorum Sond.
Thesium cathaicum Hendrych
Thesium celatum N.E. Br.
Thesium chimanimaniense Brenan
Thesium chinense Turcz.
Thesium cinereum A.W.Hill
Thesium commutatum Sond.
Thesium confine Sond.
Thesium congestum R.A. Dyer
Thesium conostylum Schltr.
Thesium cordatum A.W. Hill
Thesium coriarium A.W. Hill
Thesium cornigerum A.W. Hill
Thesium corsalpinum Hendrych
Thesium crassipes Robyns & Lawalrée
Thesium cupressoides A.W. Hill
Thesium cymosum A.W. Hill
Thesium cytisoides A.W. Hill
Thesium davidsonae Brenan
Thesium decaryanum Cavaco & Keraudren
Thesium deceptum N.E. Br.
Thesium decipiens Hilliard & B.L. Burtt
Thesium densiflorum A. DC.
Thesium densum N.E. Br.
Thesium disciflorum A.W. Hill
Thesium disparile N.E. Br.
Thesium dissitiflorum Schltr.
Thesium dissitum N.E. Br.
Thesium divaricatum Jan ex Mert. & W.D.J.Koch
Thesium diversifolium Sond.
Thesium dolichomeres Brenen
Thesium dollineri Murb. ex Velen.
Thesium doloense Pilg.
Thesium dumale N.E. Br.
Thesium durum Hilliard & B.L. Burtt
Thesium ebracteatum Hayne
Thesium ecklonianum Sond.
Thesium elatius Sond.
Thesium emodi Hendrych
Thesium equisetoides Welw. ex Hiern
Thesium ericaefolium A. DC.
Thesium euphorbioides L.
Thesium euphrasioides A. DC.
Thesium exile N.E. Br.
Thesium fallax Schltr.
Thesium fanshawei Hilliard
Thesium fastigiatum A.W. Hill
Thesium fenarium A.W. Hill
Thesium filipes A.W.Hill
Thesium fimbriatum A.W. Hill
Thesium flexuosum A. DC.
Thesium foliosum A. DC.
Thesium fructicosum A.W. Hill
Thesium fulvum A.W. Hill
Thesium funale L.
Thesium fuscum A.W.Hill
Thesium galioides A. DC.
Thesium germainii Robyns & Lawalrée
Thesium glaucescens A.W. Hill
Thesium glomeratum A.W. Hill
Thesium glomeruliflorum Sond.
Thesium goetzeanum Engl.
Thesium gracilarioides A.W. Hill
Thesium gracile A.W. Hill
Thesium gracilentum N.E. Br.
Thesium griseum Sond.
Thesium gypsophiloides A.W. Hill
Thesium hararensis A.G. Mill.
Thesium helichrysoides A.W. Hill
Thesium helodes Hilliard
Thesium hillianum Compton
Thesium himalense Royle
Thesium hirsutum A.W. Hill
Thesium hispanicum Hendrych
Thesium hispidum Schlect.
Thesium hockii Robyns & Lawalrée
Thesium hollandii Compton
Thesium hookeri Hendrych
Thesium horridum Pilg.
Thesium humbertii Cavaco & Keraudren
Thesium humifusum DC.
Thesium humile Vahl
Thesium hystricoides A.W. Hill
Thesium hystrix A.W. Hill
Thesium imbricatum Thunb.
Thesium impeditum A.W. Hill
Thesium inhambanense Hilliard
Thesium inonoense Hilliard
Thesium inversum N.E. Br.
Thesium italicum A.DC.
Thesium jarmilae Hendrych
Thesium jeanae Brenan
Thesium juncifolium DC.
Thesium junodii A.W. Hill
Thesium karooicum Compton
Thesium katangense Robyns & Lawalrée
Thesium kernerianum Simonk.
Thesium kilimandscharicum Engl.
Thesium kyrnosum Hendrych
Thesium lacinulatum A.W. Hill
Thesium laetum Robyns & Lawalrée
Thesium leandrianum Cavaco & Keraudren
Thesium leptocaule Sond.
Thesium lesliei N.E. Br.
Thesium leucanthum Gilg
Thesium lewallei Lawalrée
Thesium libericum Hepper & Keay
Thesium lineatum L. f.
Thesium linophyllon L.
Thesium linophyllum L.
Thesium lisae-mariae Stauffer
Thesium litoreum Brenan
Thesium lobelioides A. DC.
Thesium longiflorum Hand.-Mazz.
Thesium longifolium Turcz.
Thesium lopollense Hiern
Thesium losowskii Lawalrée
Thesium luembense Robyns & Lawalrée
Thesium lycopodioides Gilg
Thesium lynesii Robyns & Lawalrée
Thesium macedonicum Hendrych
Thesium macrogyne A.W. Hill
Thesium macrostachyum A. DC.
Thesium magalismontanum Sond.
Thesium magnifructum Hilliard
Thesium malaissei Lawalrée
Thesium manikense Robyns & Lawalrée
Thesium marlothii Schltr.
Thesium masukense Baker ex A.W. Hill
Thesium matteii Chiov.
Thesium maximiliani Schltr.
Thesium megalocarpum A.W.Hill
Thesium microcephalum A.W. Hill
Thesium micromeria A. DC.
Thesium microphyllum Robyns & Lawalrée
Thesium micropogon A. DC.
Thesium mossii N.E. Br.
Thesium mukense A.W. Hill
Thesium multiramulosum Pilg.
Thesium myriocladum Baker ex A.W. Hill
Thesium namaquense Schltr.
Thesium natalense Sond.
Thesium nationae A.W. Hill
Thesium nigricans Rendle
Thesium nigromontanum Sond.
Thesium nigrum A.W. Hill
Thesium nudicaule A.W. Hill
Thesium nutans Robyns & Lawalrée
Thesium occidentale A.W. Hill
Thesium oresigenum Compton
Thesium orgadophilum P.C. Tam
Thesium orientale A.W. Hill
Thesium pallidum A. DC.
Thesium palliolatum A.W. Hill
Thesium paniculatum L.
Thesium parnassi A.DC.
Thesium paronychioides Sond.
Thesium passerinoides Robyns & Lawalrée
Thesium patersonae A.W. Hill
Thesium patulum A.W. Hill
Thesium pawlowskianum Lawalrée
Thesium penicillatum A.W. Hill
Thesium perrieri Cavaco & Keraudren
Thesium phyllostachyum Sond.
Thesium pilosum A.W.Hill
Thesium pinifolium A. DC.
Thesium pleuroloma A.W. Hill
Thesium polycephalum Schltr.
Thesium polygaloides A.W.Hill
Thesium pottiae N.E. Br.
Thesium procerum N.E. Br.
Thesium procumbens C.A.Mey.
Thesium prostratum A.W. Hill
Thesium pseudocystoseiroides Cavaco & Keraudren
Thesium pseudovirgatum Levyns
Thesium psilotoides Hance
Thesium pubescens A. DC.
Thesium pungens A.W. Hill
Thesium pycnanthum Schltr.
Thesium pygmaeum Hilliard
Thesium pyrenaicum Pourr.
Thesium quarrei Robyns & Lawalrée
Thesium quinqueflorum Sond.
Thesium racemosum Bernh.
Thesium radicans Hochst. ex A. Rich.
Thesium ramosoides Hendrych
Thesium rariflorum Sond.
Thesium rasum N.E. Br.
Thesium rectangulum Welw. ex Hiern
Thesium reekmansii Lawalrée
Thesium refractum C.A.Mey.
Thesium remotebracteatum C.Y. Wu & D.D. Tao
Thesium repandum A.W. Hill
Thesium resedoides A.W.Hill
Thesium resinifolium N.E. Br.
Thesium rigidum Sond.
Thesium robynsii Lawalrée
Thesium rogersii A.W. Hill
Thesium rostratum Mert. & W.D.J.Koch
Thesium rufescens A.W. Hill
Thesium saxatile Turcz. ex A. DC.
Thesium scabridulum A.W. Hill
Thesium scabrum L.
Thesium scandens Sond.
Thesium schaijesii Lawalrée
Thesium schliebenii Pilg.
Thesium schmitzii Robyns & Lawalrée
Thesium schumannianum Schltr.
Thesium schweinfurthii Engl.
Thesium scirpioides A.W. Hill
Thesium scoparium Peter
Thesium sedifolium A. Dc. ex Levyns
Thesium selagineum A. DC.
Thesium semotum N.E. Br.
Thesium sertulariastrum A.W. Hill
Thesium setulosum Robyns & Lawalrée
Thesium shabense Lawalrée
Thesium singulare Hilliard
Thesium sommieri Hendrych
Thesium sonderianum Schltr.
Thesium spartioides A.W. Hill
Thesium sphaerocarpum Robyns & Lawalrée
Thesium spicatum L.
Thesium spinosum L. f.
Thesium spinulosum A. DC.
Thesium squarrosum L. f.
Thesium strictum P.J. Bergius
Thesium stuhlmannii Engl.
Thesium subaphyllum Engl.
Thesium subsimile N.E. Br.
Thesium susannae A.W. Hill
Thesium symoensii Lawalrée
Thesium szowitsii A.DC.
Thesium tamariscinum A.W. Hill
Thesium tenuissimum Hook. f.
Thesium tepuiense Steyerm.
Thesium tetragonum A.W.Hill
Thesium thamnus Robyns & Lawalrée
Thesium tongolicum Hendrych
Thesium translucens A.W. Hill
Thesium transvaalense Schltr.
Thesium triflorum Thunb. ex L. f.
Thesium triste A.W.Hill
Thesium ulugurense Engl.
Thesium umbelliferum A.W. Hill
Thesium unyikense Engl.
Thesium urceolatum A.W. Hill
Thesium urundiense Robyns & Lawalrée
Thesium ussanguense Engl.
Thesium utile A.W. Hill
Thesium vahrmeijeri Brenan
Thesium vimineum Robyns & Lawalrée
Thesium virens A. DC.
Thesium virgatum Lam.
Thesium viride A.W.Hill
Thesium viridifolium Levyns
Thesium vlachorum Aldén
Thesium welwitschii Hiern
Thesium white-hillense Compton
Thesium whyteanum Rendle
Thesium wilczekianum Lawalrée
Thesium xerophyticum A.W. Hill
Thesium zeyheri A. DC.

References

External links

Thesium in the Flora of China

Santalaceae
Santalales genera